Wendell Brown is an American computer scientist, entrepreneur and inventor best known for his innovations in telecommunications and Internet technology,  cybersecurity, and smartphone app development. Brown has founded multiple notable technology companies including Teleo, LiveOps and eVoice.

Early life and education
Brown's parents were both native West Virginians. His father, Foster Brown, was a professor of statistics and psychology from Wheeling, West Virginia while his mother, Barbara, was an elementary school teacher from Tunnelton, West Virginia. Brown has stated of his upbringing, "I'm proud of my West Virginia heritage, where my family tree has deep roots dating back to the founding of our nation, and I treasure many memories from times spent in the lush countryside of my parents' hometowns."

Much of Brown's upbringing was in the northernmost Appalachian town of Oneonta where his father worked as a professor and taught a variety of subjects at SUNY Oneonta. Brown attended Oneonta High School, during which time he began programming and selling personal computer systems, and published his first computer article in Byte (magazine). In 2013, he was honored with a permanent plaque on Oneonta High School's Wall of Distinction for his accomplishments in business and technology.

Brown graduated from Cornell University in 1983, earning a Bachelor of Science degree in Electrical Engineering and Computer Science. While at Cornell, Brown was awarded a Hughes Aircraft Bachelor of Science Undergraduate Fellowship.

Career
Brown is regarded as a pioneer of the expansion of gig work and remote work.

As co-founder and chairman of eVoice, Brown created the eVoice voicemail platform in 2000, the world's first large-scale, Internet-enabled voicemail system. He invented techniques such as voicemail-to-email, visual voicemail, and enhanced caller ID, innovations that are considered some of the earliest "apps," and which were later deployed by Google Voice and Apple. eVoice supplied voicemail solutions to AT&T, MCI, AOL, and regional phone companies. eVoice was acquired by AOL Time-Warner in 2001 and became part of the AOL voice services group.

In 2002, Brown co-founded LiveOps and began serving as its chairman and chief technology officer. LiveOps designs call center solutions and social media management for companies such as Coca-Cola, Pizza Hut, and eBay. That year, he was recognized as one of the Top 100 leading computer industry executives in America by technology magazine MicroTimes.

In 2006, Brown co-founded Teleo, an early competitor of Skype, where he created VoIP applications enabling users to send and receive phone calls over the Internet. Teleo was acquired by Microsoft and became part of Microsoft's MSN group in 2006.

Brown co-founded Nularis in 2011, a developer of high-efficiency LED lighting technology that supplies global franchises including Hyatt Hotels, Four Seasons Hotels and The Coffee Bean & Tea Leaf.

In 2015, Brown founded the San Francisco-based cybersecurity company Averon, which develops frictionless identity solutions based on mobile technologies. Averon presented a verified location concept on the main stage of the global TED Conference in 2016, and introduced its Direct Autonomous Authentication (DAA) mobile security technology in 2018. Multinational telecommunications provider Telefónica is a technology partner of Averon.

As a Silicon Valley angel investor, Brown has helped raise funding for notable startup companies including Appeo, ADISN, MOEO, and IronPort, which was acquired by Cisco Systems in 2007 for US$830 million.

Software developer

As one of the earliest creators of cybersecurity software, Brown founded WalkSoftly in 1996, which released the first mass market software cybersecurity programs for PCs. In 1997, Brown developed WalkSoftly's innovative Internet security package Guard Dog, which was awarded by the Software Publishers' Association as one of the Top 4 most innovative security products of the 1990s, and named by PC Data as one of the Top 10 bestselling retail security software products of all time. WalkSoftly was acquired by CyberMedia Inc. in 1997.

Brown founded Hippopotamus Software in the 1980s, an early software developer for the Macintosh. Brown's Hippo-C compiler was a software development environment for the Mac and Atari ST computer systems.

Brown developed several games for Imagic, including  a port of the 1983 arcade game Star Wars for ColecoVision, as well as Beauty & the Beast, Nova Blast, and an unreleased port of Moonsweeper for Mattel's Intellivision.

In the mid-1980s, Brown developed the ADAP SoundRack system, a pioneering direct-to-hard-disk audio recording system that replaced the traditional method of tape-splice sound editing. ADAP was used to create and edit soundtracks of Hollywood movies and TV shows, including Born on the Fourth of July, Honey, I Shrunk the Kids, Die Hard, The Cosby Show, Falcon Crest, and the pilot episode of Beverly Hills 90210. ADAP was used by recording artists Peter Gabriel, Fleetwood Mac, The Pointer Sisters, Mötley Crüe, David Bowie, and Natalie Cole among others. Utilizing his ADAP technology, Brown consulted on sound projects for The Walt Disney Company and Toshiba, and later worked as a telecommunications cryptography expert with National Semiconductor to help build hardware implementations of DS3 algorithms.

Inventor
In January 2012, the World Economic Forum in Davos honored Brown's energy efficiency inventions as a Technology Pioneer Award Nominee.

Brown has created dozens of U.S. and internationally patented inventions in the fields of cybersecurity, telecommunications, mobile phone apps, virtual workforce, electric vehicles, LED lighting, 3D cameras, renewable fuels, and online music distribution.

In 2008, Brown invented WebDiet, a method of using mobile phones to count food consumption to improve health. The WebDiet app was recognized as the first app to count calories and automate meal coaching.

Philanthropy
Brown's philanthropic involvements include the endowment of a named scholarship at Soka University of America (Aliso Viejo, California), support for Embry-Riddle Aeronautical University's Aviation Safety Lab & Library, and private sponsorship of underprivileged students in South America.

He is a longtime contributing member of the Human Rights Campaign for the advancement of LGBT civil rights, and of global Jewish service organizations.

Private life

Brown participates as a speaker, technology judge and advisor in communities including the Israel Conference, the World Economic Forum, TED (conference), Google and MIT Hackathons, Digital Life Design Munich and DLD Tel Aviv Conferences, the Web Summit Dublin, TechCrunch, CTIA - The Wireless Association, AlwaysOn ("Networking the Global Silicon Valley"), El Financiero (Bloomberg), and the Mita Institute Tech Talks.

Brown is an advisory committee member of the Progressive X Prize for automobile innovation including new fuel technologies and electric car development, an advisor to the MITA Institute Venture Fund, as well as an advisor to Gener8, a stereoscopic 3D movie company with film credits including The Amazing Spider-Man and Harry Potter and the Deathly Hallows – Part 2.

Brown is a licensed private pilot and is active in the development of new airplane, rocket, and electric vehicle designs. He is married to American author Taro Gold.

References

External links
 Microsoft/Teleo acquisition
 Cisco/IronPort acquisition 
 AOL/eVoice acquisition

Year of birth missing (living people)
Living people
People from Oneonta, New York
20th-century American inventors
20th-century American businesspeople
21st-century American businesspeople
American computer businesspeople
American computer programmers
American technology chief executives
American technology company founders
American technology writers
Businesspeople in software
Cornell University College of Engineering alumni
Engineers from New York (state)
IronPort people
American LGBT businesspeople
LGBT people from New York (state)
Philanthropists from New York (state)